Year 1367 (MCCCLXVII) was a common year starting on Friday (link will display the full calendar) of the Julian calendar.

Events

January–December 
 January 18 – Ferdinand I becomes King of Portugal after the death of his father, Peter I.
 April 3 – Battle of Nájera: Pedro of Castile is restored as King of Castile (in modern-day Spain) after defeating his half-brother, Henry II. Pedro is aided in the battle by the English under Edward, the Black Prince, and Henry by the French.
 April 24 – Otto I, "the Evil", becomes Duke of the independent city of Göttingen (in modern-day Germany) on the death of his father, Ernst I.
 October 16 – Pope Urban V makes the first attempt to move the Papacy back to Rome from Avignon. This move is reversed in 1370, when he is forced to return to Avignon, and shortly afterwards dies.
 Winter – Construction of a stone Moscow Kremlin Wall around the city is begun to resist invasion by the Grand Duchy of Lithuania.
 End – Petru I succeeds his grandfather Bogdan I as voivode (ruler) of Moldavia.
 Undated – The first university in Pécs, Hungary, is founded by King Louis I.

Births 
 January 6 – King Richard II of England (d. 1400)
 March 22 or 1368 – Thomas de Mowbray, 1st Duke of Norfolk, English politician (d. 1399)
 June 13 – King Taejong of Joseon, Korean king (d. 1422)
 date unknown – Michael de la Pole, 2nd Earl of Suffolk, English politician (d. 1415)
 probable – Mary of Enghien, queen consort of Naples (d. 1446)

Deaths 
 January 9 – Giulia della Rena, Italian saint (b. 1319)
 January 18 – King Peter I of Portugal (b. 1320)
 April 13 – John Tiptoft, 2nd Baron Tibetot (b. 1313)
 August 23 – Gil Álvarez Carrillo de Albornoz, Spanish cardinal (b. 1310)
 September 25 – Jakushitsu Genkō, Japanese poet (b. 1290)
 December 28 – Ashikaga Yoshiakira, Japanese shōgun (b. 1330)
 date unknown
 Bogdan I of Moldavia

References